John Arthur Cottrill (born 18 November 1945) is an Australian former professional tennis player.

Cottrill, a New South Wales junior hard court champion from Sydney, was a member of Australia's Davis Cup squad for a 1965 tie against Spain. He took Roy Emerson to five sets in the semi-finals of the 1966 Australian Hard Court Championships. In 1967, his final year on tour, he was married to tennis player Joan Gibson and partnered with her to make the mixed doubles quarter-finals at Wimbledon. They had a son born in 1969.

References

External links
 

1945 births
Living people
Australian male tennis players
Tennis players from Sydney